ABViewer is multifunctional software for working with AutoCAD DWG, DXF, PLT, STEP, IGES, STL and other 2D and 3D CAD files. The application allows creating and editing drawings, as well as saving them to AutoCAD DWG/DXF, PDF, JPG and a number of other vector and raster file formats.

The software was developed by CADSoftTools in 2003. Since that time, the program has been translated into more than 30 languages and now it supports more than 50 2D/3D vector and raster formats.

History
The early version of ABViewer presented a viewer that also allowed merging CAD files, storing BMP and EMF images in the clipboard, as well as printing a group of files. Initially, the program supported 20 languages and was available in two versions: Standard and Professional. In 2007, ABViewer was no longer just a viewer. It became a tool for viewing, editing and converting files. The application had a full set of tools of a professional editor and supported operations used in design and project work. As a converter, ABViewer made it possible to convert selected parts of the image. Now depending on the functionality the program is available in three versions (Standard, Professional and Enterprise).

Features

Viewer
ABViewer allows viewing 2D and 3D drawings. It supports work with drawing layers and layouts; users can reposition drawings: i.e. zoom, rotate 3D models as well as change the drawing display view and mode; users can navigate through files by means of the Thumbnails window. It is possible to hide/show texts and dimensions as well as measure drawings (both in 2D and 3D modes). The program not only displays drawings but also provides access to drawing properties and structure. Also, it is possible to create 3D section views.

Editor
The Editor mode enables users to create drawings from scratch as well as edit loaded files. ABViewer offers a wide range of tools for working with CAD drawings: drawing tools (used to add entities); modifying instruments (for work with created drawings); different types of snap; work with blocks and external references.

Saving and printing
ABViewer allows saving as well as printing drawings: saving to vector and raster file formats; saving DWG/DXF drawings to G-code; extended printing settings (multipage printing, print preview, plot settings). Batch operations with multiple files are available too: batch conversion and batch print.

Advanced features
ABViewer also provides additional functionality for work with drawings: conversion of PDF drawings into editable DWG files, the Redline mode for adding markups, comparison of DWG/DXF drawing revisions, georeferencing, work from the command line, LISP support as well as XML support.

Supported formats
ABViewer allows viewing more than 50 vector and raster 2D and 3D formats:

The program opens archived drawings too: ZIP, 7z, RAR, CAB, BZIP, TAR.

Localization
ABViewer is fully translated into the following languages:  Chinese, Czech, Dutch, English, Finnish, French, German, Hebrew, Hungarian, Italian, Brazilian Portuguese, Russian, and Spanish. ABViewer documentation and detailed help system are available in English, German, French, and Russian.

Reception
Ron LaFon from the Cadalyst compared nine different CAD Viewers in 2008 and AViewer v6.2 was among them.
He stated that the program supported lots of languages (32 languages in total at that time), had “clean and easy to understand” user interface and a variety of available features.

The Digital Engineering magazine named ABViewer (version 7) a “cost-efficient high-quality application” that could be used by engineers as well as by office workers. The Thumbnail visualization of the folder contents was highlighted in particular as this feature makes the search for the required files considerably easier.
Softpedia describes ABViewer version 14 as a modern tool that can help in a variety of tasks and is easy and user-friendly even for inexperienced users.

Apart from it ABViewer is referenced to as a tool for measuring, converting and viewing CAD files in a number of modern studies and researches in different fields.

See also
CAD
DWG
ShareCAD, a free online service for viewing DWG and other CAD files
List of computer-aided technologies companies and their software products
Comparison of computer-aided design editors

References

External links
 CADSoftTools official website

Computer-aided design software
Computer-aided design software for Windows
2003 software